Dongfeng Fengxing Jingyi (东风风行景逸) is a series of passenger vehicles sold under the Dongfeng Fengxing (东风风行) sub-brand of Dongfeng Liuzhou Motor, a subsidiary of Dongfeng Motors.

History

The Dongfeng Fengxing Jingyi (景逸) was originally a compact MPV produced by Dongfeng Liuzhou Motor under the Dongfeng Fengxing sub-brand. The compact MPV was later renamed to Dongfeng Fengxing Jingyi X5 as the Dongfeng Fengxing Jingyi became a series of passenger vehicles including sedans, CUVs, and MPVs.

Products
Jingyi S50 compact sedan/Jingyi S50 EV electric compact sedan
Jingyi X3 subcompact crossover
Jingyi X5 compact crossover
Jingyi X6 mid-size crossover
Jingyi X7 mid-size crossover

Product Gallery

References

External links
 

Dongfeng Motor divisions and subsidiaries
Front-wheel-drive vehicles
Compact MPVs
Cars of China